Berenice or Berenike  was a Greek city in the region of ancient Epirus, near current Preveza. It was founded by Pyrrhus II of Epirus (r. 255–238 ВСE).

See also
List of cities in ancient Epirus

References 

3rd-century BC establishments
Populated places established in the 3rd century BC
Pyrrhus of Epirus
Epirote colonies
Populated places in ancient Epirus
Former populated places in Greece